Kevin McDowell (born August 1, 1992) is an American professional triathlete. He currently resides and trains in Colorado Springs, Colorado.

McDowell was born in Park Ridge, Illinois in the northwest suburbs of Chicago, and was raised in nearby Mount Prospect until he was six years old, when his family moved to Geneva in the outer west suburbs.

McDowell was announced to be competing at the 2020 Summer Olympics in Tokyo. After the Games were postponed for a year, McDowell placed sixth in the men's triathlon on July 25, 2021. On July 29, McDowell won a silver medal in the first-ever mixed relay event alongside Morgan Pearson, Katie Zaferes and Taylor Knibb.

References

1992 births
Living people
American male triathletes
Triathletes at the 2020 Summer Olympics
Medalists at the 2020 Summer Olympics
Olympic silver medalists for the United States in triathlon
Olympic triathletes of the United States
Triathletes at the 2010 Summer Youth Olympics
University of Colorado Colorado Springs alumni
Sportspeople from Park Ridge, Illinois
Sportspeople from Kane County, Illinois
Triathletes at the 2015 Pan American Games
Pan American Games silver medalists for the United States
Pan American Games medalists in triathlon
Medalists at the 2015 Pan American Games